Kris Burm is a Belgian game designer specializing in abstract board games. He is best known for his award-winning GIPF series of games.  He was born in Antwerp, Belgium in 1957 and moved to nearby Schilde in 2005.

Published games include:

Balanx (1994)
Batik (1997)
Bi-litaire (1997)
Dicemaster (1997)
DVONN (2001)
Elcanto (2001)
Flix (1995)
GIPF (1998)
Invers (1991)
LYNGK (2017)
Orient (1995)
Oxford (1993)
PÜNCT (2005)
Quads (1996)
TAMSK (1998)
Tashkent (3x3) (1995)
Tashkent (5x5) (1997)
TZAAR (2007)
YINSH (2003)
ZÈRTZ (2000)

All his published games are abstract, except Dicemaster, which is a collectible dice game.

External links

Bruno Faidutti on Burm (from archive.org)
Gipf.com short piece on Burm
Homepage of Kris Burm (Dutch)
Homepage of the GIPF Project games

1957 births
Flemish scientists
Board game designers
Living people
Businesspeople from Antwerp